Sandle is a surname. Notable people with the surname include:

 Michael Sandle (born 1936), British sculptor and artist
 Wes Sandle (1935–2020), New Zealand physicist
 Jennie Formby (née Sandle; born 1960), British trade unionist and politician

See also
 Sandal (disambiguation)
 Sandler (disambiguation)